"Tonight" is a song by Irish boy band Westlife. It was released together with "Miss You Nights" as a double A-side single on 24 March 2003 in the UK. It was the second and final single from their first compilation album, Unbreakable – The Greatest Hits Volume 1 (2002). In other countries, "Tonight" was released without "Miss You Nights" as separately with an emphasis more on the "Tonight" release. The double A-side peaked at  1 in Ireland, becoming Westlife's 10th number-one single in their home country. In the United Kingdom, the single reached No. 3 on the UK Singles Chart.

Background and content
"Tonight" was written by Steve Mac, Wayne Hector and Jorgen Elofsson. It was composed in the traditional verse–chorus form in B major, with McFadden and Filan vocal ranging from the chords of F4 to B5.

Track listings

UK CD1
 "Tonight" (single remix)
 "Miss You Nights" (single remix)
 "Where We Belong"
 "Tonight" (video)

UK CD2
 "Tonight" (single remix)
 "Tonight" (12-inch Metro mix)
 "Miss You Nights" (video)

European CD single
 "Tonight" (single remix)
 "Where We Belong"

European maxi-CD single
 "Tonight" (single remix)
 "Tonight" (7-inch Metro mix)
 "Where We Belong"
 "Tonight" (video)

Australian CD single
 "Tonight" (single remix)
 "Tonight" (Metro mix)
 "Where We Belong"

Charts

Weekly charts

Year-end charts

Release history

References

External links
 Official Westlife Website

2002 songs
2003 singles
Bertelsmann Music Group singles
RCA Records singles
Song recordings produced by Steve Mac
Songs written by Jörgen Elofsson
Songs written by Steve Mac
Songs written by Wayne Hector
Syco Music singles
Westlife songs